Dauphin is a rural municipality in the Parkland Region of Manitoba, Canada. The municipality surrounds the separately administered city of Dauphin, and lies just north of Riding Mountain National Park, part of which extends into the RM.

Communities
 Keld
 North Junction
 Paulson
 Sifton
 Trembowla
 Valley River

Demographics 

Transportation

Air 
Dauphin Municipal Airport
 Regional airport
 Daily service to Winnipeg
 Perimeter Airlines
 Night and all-weather facilities
 Avgas and aircraft maintenance
 Capable of landing 737 and Hercules Transport

Rail 
 Canadian National Rail Secondary Mainline
 Via Rail passenger service

Road 
 Provincial Trunk Highways #5, #10, and #20
 Gardewine North trucking, Purolator & Loomis courier
 Local short/long-distance trucking companies

Energy & communications 
Hydro electricity
 3-phase power supply
 Provided by Manitoba Hydro
Natural gas
 3" Natural Gas Line (49,560 mcf )
 Provided by Manitoba Hydro
Communications
 Digital tower, DSL High-Speed Internet
 Provided by MTS Allstream, I-Netlink and Xplornet
 WCGtv provided by Westman Communications Group

Water & waste management 
Water supply source
 Edwards Lake/Creek System and Vermillion Reservoir
Waste management
 Total capacity of storage site is 
 Currently operating at 75% capacity
 $2.5 million upgrading 2003 and 2005
 2 landfills (one at Sifton; one shared with City of Dauphin)
 Recycling program

Industrial park 
 Fully Serviced
 Land available in Sifton, Dauphin and other areas

Education 
Serviced by the Mountain View School Division
Total K-12 School Enrollment: 1,769 (as of February 2009)
 Ecole MacNeill K-6 School: 149
 Henderson Elementary: 239
 Barker K-6 School 269
 Smith-Jackson K-6 School 95
 Whitmore K-6 School 127
 Mackenzie Middle 7-8 School 274
 Dauphin Regional Comprehensive School 616
Post-secondary schools:
 Assiniboine Community College (Dauphin) varies
 Campus Manitoba (Dauphin) varies

Services
Fire department

:
 Total of 35 member volunteers
 1 rural tanker
 4 pumper trucks
 1 aerial ladder
 3 rescue wagons
 1 portable trailer
 1 kodiak rescue boat
 1 snowmobile rescue sleigh
 jaws-of-life
Ambulance
 4 ambulances
 24-hour service
 Advanced life support service
Police
 Royal Canadian Mounted Police (RCMP)
 24-hour service
 Rural Crime Watch program
Post office
 Full Service

Local media
 Dauphin Herald newspaper (weekly)
 Parkland Shopper newspaper (weekly)
 730 CKDM radio (Dauphin)

Health 
Dauphin Regional Health Centre:
 107 beds
 Laboratory testing, x-ray, EKG, CT scanner, hemodialysis, ultra-sound, fluoroscopy, medical and surgical wards
 Intensive Care Unit
 Parkland Family Medicine Residency Program
 Community Health Services
 911 emergency services
Special care services
 Doctors: 21 and visiting medical staff available
 Dentists: 8
 Optometrists: 3
 Chiropractors: 4
 Personal Care Home: 70 beds
 Other Services: Handi-van
 Home Care & Meals on Wheels
 Telehealth

Recreation
 Parkland Recreation Complex:
 Curling rink - 6 sheets of ice
 Indoor leisure & waved pool, waterslide, 2 indoor arenas,
 1 outdoor arena
 18-hole golf course (RM of Ochre River)
 Beach and campgrounds
 Vermillion Park Sportsplex (baseball & soccer)
 Selo Ukraina amphitheatre (10,000 seats)
 International festivals: National Ukrainian Festival, Countryfest, and Dauphin's Christian Music Festival (Jesus Manifest)
 Historical sites and district museums
 Dauphin Bible Camp

References

External links
 Map of Dauphin R.M. at Statcan
 RM of Dauphin Fact Sheet 

Rural municipalities in Manitoba